Liotard Glacier is a channel glacier in Antarctica. The glacier was delineated from air photos taken by U.S. Navy Operation Highjump, 1946–47, and was named by the Advisory Committee on Antarctic Names for Andre-Frank Liotard, the leader of the French Antarctic Expedition, 1949–51, whose group completed the initial survey of the coastal features as far westward as this glacier.

See also
 List of glaciers in the Antarctic
 Glaciology
 Janet Rock

References

Glaciers of Adélie Land